is a Japanese politician and the leader of the Democratic Party for the People (DPFP). He is a member of the House of Representatives, and a former leader of Kibō no Tō. Before joining Kibō, Tamaki was a member of the Democratic Party.

Early life and government career 
Tamaki was born in Sangawa, a small rural town in Kagawa Prefecture. His parents are engaged in agriculture.

After graduating from the Faculty of Law, University of Tokyo, he joined the Ministry of Finance in 1993. With government sponsorship, he obtained an MPA from the John F. Kennedy School of Government in 1997, and thereafter served on secondments to the Ministry of Foreign Affairs (where he covered Jordan and Libya), Financial Services Agency, Osaka Regional Tax Office, and Cabinet Office. In the latter role, he worked closely with LDP Cabinet ministers Nobuteru Ishihara, Kazuyoshi Kaneko, and Seiichiro Murakami on administrative reform efforts.

Political career 
Tamaki resigned from government service in 2005 to run in the 2005 general election after both the Liberal Democratic Party and Democratic Party of Japan approached him to run. He chose to run as a DPJ candidate despite having recently worked in incumbent LDP Prime Minister Junichiro Koizumi's Cabinet Office. He lost in this race, and spent the next four years living with his extended family in the countryside.

In his second electoral attempt in the 2009 election, he won a seat representing the Kagawa 2nd district, and the DPJ took over the reins of government from the LDP. Tamaki held this seat in the 2012 election, after which he was appointed Deputy Secretary-General of the DPJ, and held this seat again in the 2014 election.

Tamaki was elected as the leader of Kibō no Tō in November 2017. In May 2018, Tamaki led a majority of Kibō members to merge with the Democratic Party, forming the DPFP. Tamaki became the co-leader of the new party, along with DP leader Kohei Otsuka. He would then win a 3-year term as sole party leader in September 2018.

In 2019, Tamaki publicly proposed a meeting with Prime Minister Shinzo Abe to discuss constitutional reform, as well as a debate in the Diet on constitutional revision.

In September 2020, the DPFP disbanded, with most members joining the Constitutional Democratic Party. Tamaki and several other conservative DPFP members broke off to form their own party. Among other issues, Tamaki did not agree with the CDP's approach to lowering the consumption tax.

Political views 
He supports the expansion of the Japan Self-Defense Forces' activities outside of Japan, saying that the 2015 security laws should be amended instead of being repealed. Tamaki is supportive of amending the constitution, as he says that not setting out the scope of the Japan Self-Defense Forces gives Abe too much authority of what they can do. Opponents of this position, such as Hiroshi Ogushi, say that this is unnecessary. Tamaki opposes the Technical Intern Training Program, saying that it should instead by replaced with a program that specifies what industry a worker may work in and what country they may come from.

On January 4, 2023, Izumi visited Ise Grand Shrine on the same day as Prime Minister Fumio Kishida and DPP leader Yūichirō Tamaki. Some liberals, progressives and Christians in Japan criticized them for affirming historical colonialism and trying to revive militarism.

References

Kibō no Tō politicians
Members of the House of Representatives (Japan)
Politicians from Kagawa Prefecture
1969 births
Living people
University of Tokyo alumni
Harvard Kennedy School alumni